Option Canada was a Montreal-based lobby group established some eight weeks before the voting day of the 1995 Quebec referendum on sovereignty. According to registration papers filed with both the Canadian and Quebec governments, the private group was incorporated by executives of the Canadian Unity Council  on September 7, 1995. The group was disbanded soon after the referendum was over.

At the time of its operations, the group was composed of businessmen and political organizers of three federalist political parties - the Liberal Party of Canada, the Quebec Liberal Party and the Progressive Conservative Party of Canada. The president of Option Canada was Claude Dauphin, an aide to Paul Martin, at the time Canadian minister of finance.

Option Canada first caught media attention in Quebec when the group created the Committee to Register Voters Outside Quebec in order to help citizens who had left Quebec in the two years before the referendum vote register on the electoral list of the province. Since 1989, a clause of the Quebec electoral law allows for ex-residents of Quebec to signal their intention of returning to Quebec and vote by mail. The Committee, which operated during the time of the referendum campaign, handed-out pamphlets which included the Chief Electoral Officer of Quebec form to fill out in order to be added to the list of voters. The pamphlet also gave out a toll-free number as contact information which was the same number as the one used by the Canadian Unity Council.

After the referendum, the Chief Electoral Officer of Quebec, Pierre F. Côté, filed 20 criminal charges of illegal expenditures and opened an inquiry on Option Canada. However, following Supreme Court ruling October 17, 1997(Libman vs. Quebec-Attorney General), some sections of Quebec's referendum law were judged unconstitutional. Quebec's Chief Electoral Officer consequently had to interrupt the conduct of his inquiry and drop the charges.

Continued investigation by former Radio-Canada journalist Normand Lester lead the revelation of a $4.8-million grant awarded to Option Canada by Heritage Canada.

In early January 2006, The Globe and Mail newspaper reported that the Royal Canadian Mounted Police (RCMP) had launched an inquiry on Option Canada at the request of the Department of Canadian Heritage.

The Grenier report

On 13 January 2006, Marcel Blanchet, the Chief Electoral Officer of Quebec, announced the appointment of Bernard Grenier, a retired Quebec Court judge, as investigating commissioner in charge of examining the documents. Grenier's report, without a mandate for laying charges, said Option Quebec spent $539,000 illegally supporting the "No" campaign during the 1995 Quebec Referendum on sovereignty. There were non-authorized expenditures under Quebec's strictures on referendums. Grenier's findings undermined Philpot and Lester's accusations that $3.5 million in federal funds was given to the "No" campaign against Quebec's electoral laws. Philpot and Lester called for a complete investigation.

Jocelyn Beaudoin worked for the Option Canada group during the 1995 Quebec Referendum. He worked as Quebec's representative in Toronto, charged with defending Quebec's interests in Ontario, Western Canada and the territories. He was suspended with pay after the January 2006 publication of Les secrets d'Option Canada, a book which accused Beaudoin of using federal government money for the "No" campaign during the 1995 referendum.

Grenier found that Beaudoin was an Option Canada decision-maker. Grenier said the evidence contradicted Beaudoin's claims he was not involved with Option Canada after 7 September 1995. Beaudoin had instructed personnel, negotiated applications for subsidies, and received $24,000 for his expense account. After the Grenier report was released, he resigned his position.

In Ottawa, Labour and Quebec Economic Development Minister Jean-Pierre Blackburn defended Michelle D'Auray, who Grenier concluded spent $8583 of Option Canada funds that should have been submitted for approval. D'Auray now serves as Secretary of the Treasury Board of Canada.

See also 

 1995 Quebec referendum
 Sponsorship Scandal

References
"Mounties eye another referendum handout" in The Globe and Mail, January 5, 2006

External links
 Press release announcing the Investigation

Political history of Quebec
Federalism in Canada
1995 in politics
1995 establishments in Quebec